The McCarley Mini-Mac was a single-seat aerobatic sport aircraft designed in the United States in the early 1970s and marketed for home building. It was a conventional, low-wing cantilever monoplane with a cockpit enclosed by a bubble canopy. The undercarriage was of fixed, tricycle type with spats fitted to the prototype, as well as a small skid fitted as a tail bumper. Construction was of metal throughout.

Specifications (prototype)

Notes

References
 
 

1970s United States sport aircraft
Homebuilt aircraft
Aerobatic aircraft
Low-wing aircraft
Aircraft first flown in 1970
Single-engined tractor aircraft